Thanh Miện is a rural district of Hải Dương province in the Red River Delta region of Vietnam. As of 2003 the district had a population of 131,552. The district covers an area of 122 km2. The district capital lies at Thanh Miện.

References

Districts of Hải Dương province